Shang-Yi Ch'en (4 March 1910 – 23 February 1997) was a Chinese-born American physicist who was Professor Emeritus of Physics at the University of Oregon. His field was optical spectroscopy, and his research interests included spectral line shifts and collision-induced absorption and emission of atoms. He was elected a Fellow of the American Physical Society in 1963.

Early life and education 
Ch'en was born 4 March 1910 in Hebei, China. In Beijing at Yenching University he earned a B.S. degree in 1932 and an M.S. degree in 1934. As a research assistant at the National Academy of the Beijing Institute of Physics, he studied pressure broadening of spectral lines. He received a fellowship from the China Foundation to study at the California Institute of Technology, where in 1940 his Ph.D. dissertation was published, supervised by Ira S. Bowen, titled The broadening of the resonance lines of rubidium under different homogenous pressures of its own vapor. The broadening, asymmetry and drift of rubidium resonance lines under homogenous pressures of helium and argon up to 100 atmospheres.

Career 
When Ch'en completed his final exams in 1939, he returned to Yenching University in China to be near his family; he did not attend his Caltech graduation, thus missing recognition due for his cum laude honors. He conducted research at Yenching, establishing a spectroscopy lab there until the beginning of World War II, when he fled to Chengtu in southwestern China.

Following the war, in 1949 Ch'en joined the faculty at the University of Oregon, where he taught and conducted research until his retirement in 1975. According to his colleagues Bernd Craseman and David McDaniels, "Among his most widely known work is a survey of the field... written with Makoto Takeo and published in the Reviews of Modern Physics" in 1957.

He also served as an associate editor of The Journal of Quantitative Spectroscopy and Radiative Transfer.

Shang-Yi Ch'en Professorship 
Robert A. Millikan wrote encouraging letters to Ch'en that his son Eugene found after his father's death. According to his son, "When he came to Caltech, it was really, truly a foreign environment for him... There was nobody he knew here. He had very limited resources..." His son  has established a trust to support the Shang-Yi Ch'en Professorship at Caltech.

Selected publications

Awards and honors 
1963, Fellow of the American Physical Society

References 

1910 births
1997 deaths
20th-century American physicists
California Institute of Technology alumni
Chinese emigrants to the United States
Fellows of the American Physical Society
University of Oregon faculty